Bangladeshis in the Middle East, form the largest part of the worldwide Bangladeshi diaspora. Although Bangladesh only came into existence in 1971, the land which is today Bangladesh has strong ties to the Middle East. Out of the 13 Million Bangladeshis abroad approximately 8 million live within the Middle East, with 2.5 million in Saudi Arabia and a 1 million of them in the United Arab Emirates. Bangladeshis who come to the Middle East are primarily guest workers or day labourers. Bangladesh is one of the largest labour suppliers to Saudi Arabia. In 2007, Bangladeshi workers obtained the biggest share, with 23.50 per cent of the 1.5 million Saudi Arabia visas issued.

History
The introduction of Islam to the Bengali people has generated a connection to the Arabian Peninsula, as Muslims are required to visit the land once in their lifetime to complete the Hajj pilgrimage. Several Bengali sultans funded Islamic institutions in the Hejaz, which popularly became known by the Arabs as Bangali Madaris. It is unknown when Bengalis began settling in Arab lands though an early example is that of Haji Shariatullah's teacher Mawlana Murad, who was permanently residing in the city of Mecca in the early 1800s.

Living conditions

Migrant labour in the region, from which Bangladeshi citizens form a sizable minority, are brought in through the kafala system, which provides employment-based visas and bars workers from attaining longer-term residency. Like other Asian expatriates, Bangladeshi citizens have sought work in the region primarily to send remittances back to their families and share little in common culturally with their host societies. Many have additionally been motivated by the proximity to Mecca in hopes of performing the rites of the Hajj.

Human rights organizations continue to report on widespread violations of labour and human rights of migrant workers in the Gulf region. Reported abuses include the confiscation of passports, mobility restrictions, excessive working hours, delayed or absent salary payments, sub-par working and living conditions, as well as sexual, physical and psychological abuse of workers by their employers.

Notable people
Syed Neaz Ahmad, academic, writer, journalist, and critic
Rabiul Hoque, cricket umpire
Aamer Rahman, stand-up comedian
Elita Karim, singer, journalist, performer, anchor and voice artist.

See also
Bangladeshis in the United Arab Emirates
Demographics of Saudi Arabia 
Demographics of United Arab Emirates 
Demographics of Kuwait
Demographics of Oman   
Demographics of Qatar 
Demographics of Bahrain
Demographics of Jordan
Demographics of Egypt

References

Bangladeshi diaspora